Kaldrma is a village located in the Gračac municipality within the Zadar County in Croatia.

Population

According to the 2011 census, Kaldrma had 31 inhabitants.

1991 census

According to the 1991 census, settlement of Kaldrma had 175 inhabitants, which were ethnically declared as this:

Austro-Hungarian 1910 census

According to the 1910 census, settlement of Kaldrma had 268 inhabitants in 2 hamlets, which were linguistically and religiously declared as this:

Transport

Railway
Kaldrma railway station was built on the Oštrelj-Drvar-Knin narrow-gauge railway in 1902. The so-called Steinbeiss Railway, built mainly to service the fledgling timber industry, branched off past Drvar, further to Jajce and Prijedor. After WWII, in 1948 the Knin-Kaldrma section was upgraded to a normal gauge in order to become a part of a new Una railway, an important rail link between Zagreb and Dalmatia. Old narrow-gauge line towards Drvar branched off from Una railway in Kaldrma. While other narrow-gauge sections further east were gradually closed, amidst heavy lobbying and protests from locals, Kaldrma kept its old link to Drvar until May 28, 1978, when the last train arrived from Drvar to Kaldrma station. In 1987, Una railway was electrified.

Traffic on Una railway was only sporadic during the Croatian War of Independence (1991–1995) due to the breakaway Serb Krajina blockade. After 1995, traffic was not reintroduced due to the damage and difficulties concerning numerous border crossings on the line.

Nature 

A lake situated northwest from Kaldrma railway station is believed to be a rare example of bifurcation; namely, some of the lake's water ends up in the Black Sea via Una river, while some of it flows into the Adriatic Sea via Krka river.

Literature 

  Savezni zavod za statistiku i evidenciju FNRJ i SFRJ, popis stanovništva 1948, 1953, 1961, 1971, 1981. i 1991. godine.
 Knjiga: "Narodnosni i vjerski sastav stanovništva Hrvatske, 1880-1991: po naseljima, author: Jakov Gelo, izdavač: Državni zavod za statistiku Republike Hrvatske, 1998., ;

References

Populated places in Zadar County
Lika